Adaptive capacity relates to the capacity of systems, institutions, humans and other organisms to adjust to potential damage, to take advantage of opportunities, or to respond to consequences. In the context of ecosystems, adaptive capacity is determined by genetic diversity of species, biodiversity of particular ecosystems, heterogeneous ecosystem mosaics as applied to specific landscapes or biome regions. In the context of coupled socio-ecological social systems, adaptive capacity is commonly associated with following characteristics the ability of institutions and networks to learn, and store knowledge and experience; creative flexibility in decision making, transitioning and problem solving; and the existence of power structures that are responsive and consider the needs of all stakeholders. 

In the context of climate change adaptation, adaptive capacity depends on the inter-relationship of social, political, economic, technological and institutional factors operating at a variety of scales. Some of these are generic, and others are exposure-specific.

Benefits 
Adaptive capacity confers resilience to perturbation, giving ecological and human social systems the ability to reconfigure themselves with minimum loss of function. In ecological systems, this resilience shows as net primary productivity and maintenance of biomass and biodiversity, and the stability of hydrological cycles. In human social systems it is demonstrated by the stability of social relations, the maintenance of social capital and economic prosperity.  

Building adaptive capacity is particular important in the context of climate change, where it refers to a latent capacity - in terms of resources and assets - from which adaptations can be made as required depending on future circumstances. Since future climate is likely to be different from the present climate, developing adaptive capacity is a prerequisite for the adaptation that can reduce the potential negative effects of exposure to climate change. In climate change, adaptive capacity, along with hazard, exposure and vulnerability, is a key component that contributes to risk, or the potential for harm or impact.

Characteristics
Adaptive capacity can be enhanced in a number of different ways. A report by the Overseas Development Institute introduces the local adaptive capacity framework (LAC), featuring five core characteristics of adaptive capacity. These include:

 Asset base: the availability of a diverse range of key livelihood assets that allow households or communities to respond to evolving circumstances

 Institutions and entitlements: the existence of an appropriate and evolving institutional environment that allows for access and entitlement to key assets and capitals

 Knowledge and information: the ability households and communities have to generate, receive, assess and disseminate knowledge and information in support of appropriate adaptation options

 Innovation: the system creates an enabling environment to foster innovation, experimentation and the ability to explore niche solutions in order to take advantage of new opportunities

 Flexible forward-looking decision-making and governance: the system is able to anticipate, incorporate and respond to changes with regards to its governance structures and future planning.

Many development interventions - such as social protection programmes and efforts to promote social safety nets - can play important roles in promoting aspects of adaptive capacity.

Relationship between adaptive capacity, states and strategies 
Adaptive capacity is associated with r and K selection strategies in ecology and with a movement from explosive positive feedback to sustainable negative feedback loops in social systems and technologies.
The Resilience Alliance shows how the logistic curve of the r phase positive feedback, becoming replaced by the K negative feedback strategy is an important part of adaptive capacity.  The r strategy is associated with situations of low complexity, high resilience, and growing potential.  K strategies are associated with situations of high complexity, high potential and high resilience, but if the perturbations exceed certain limits, adaptive capacity may be exceeded and the system collapses into another so-called Omega state, of low potential, low complexity and low resilience.

In the context of climate change

See also
 Adaptability

References

Environmental economics
Social concepts